The adjective discordant ('conflicting, disagreeing, at variance') may describe:

Earth science 
 Discordant rock, one that cuts across the existing bedding: as in one of the main types of igneous intrusion, or as in the sedimentary clastic dikes
 Discordant strata, rock layers with mismatches in the geologic record
 Discordant coastline, when the bands of rock run perpendicular to the coast
 Discordant drainage pattern, where the pattern of rivers and streams does not correlate with the underlying geology

Other uses 
 Discordant, or dissonant, sounds, in music
 Discordant pair of observations, in statistics
 Discordant twins, in twin studies
 Serodiscordant relationship, where one of the partners is HIV-positive and the other is not

See also 
 Discordianism
 Discord (disambiguation)
 Dissonance (disambiguation)